The Superettan 2009 was the ninth season of Sweden's second-tier football league. The season began on 11 April 2009 and ended on 24 October 2009.

The top 2 teams qualified directly for promotion to Allsvenskan, the third played a play-off against the fourteenth from Allsvenskan to decide who qualified to play in Allsvenskan 2010.
The bottom 2 teams qualified directly for relegation to Division 1, the thirteenth and the fourteenth played a play-off against the numbers two from Division 1 Södra and Division 1 Norra to decide who qualified to play in Superettan 2010.

Participating teams

League table

Results

Relegation play-offs 
Trollhättan and Qviding, who were the 13th and 14th teams in Superettan 2009 faced with Brage and Skövde, who were runners-up of Division 1.

Trollhättan won the play-out by 7-4 aggragate and remained in Superettan for 2010 season. Skövde, Division 1 Södra runner-up, didn't promote.

Brage, Division 1 Norra runner-up, won the play-out by 3-1 aggregate and promoted to Superettan for 2010 season. Qviding relegated to Division 1 Norra.

Season statistics

Top scorers

Top assists

Top goalkeepers 
(Minimum of 10 games played)

Attendances 

Source: svenskfotboll.se

References

External links 
 Superettan 

Superettan seasons
2
Sweden
Sweden